Percy Harold Wakefield (3 September 1888 – 20 December 1973) was an English first-class cricketer who played in one match for Worcestershire against Hampshire at New Road in 1922.

In a game most notable for Phil Mead's exploits for Hampshire — he scored 235 and shared in a last-wicket stand of 127 with Stuart Boyes — Wakefield's own contribution was minimal: he scored 0 and 8, sent down three wicketless overs, and held a catch to dismiss Hampshire captain Lord Tennyson.

Notes

External links
Statistical summary from CricketArchive

English cricketers
Worcestershire cricketers
1888 births
1973 deaths
People from Pill, Somerset